European route E 604 is a European B class road in France, connecting the cities Tours and Vierzon.

Route 
 
 E05, E60, E502 Tours
 E11 Vierzon

External links 
 UN Economic Commission for Europe: Overall Map of E-road Network (2007)
 International E-road network

Roads in France